Elections to Fermanagh District Council were held on 5 May 2005 on the same day as the other Northern Irish local government elections. The election used four district electoral areas to elect a total of 23 councillors.

Election results

Note: "Votes" are the first preference votes.

Districts summary

|- class="unsortable" align="centre"
!rowspan=2 align="left"|Ward
! % 
!Cllrs
! % 
!Cllrs
! %
!Cllrs
! %
!Cllrs
! %
!Cllrs
!rowspan=2|TotalCllrs
|- class="unsortable" align="center"
!colspan=2 bgcolor="" | Sinn Féin
!colspan=2 bgcolor="" | UUP
!colspan=2 bgcolor="" | SDLP
!colspan=2 bgcolor="" | DUP
!colspan=2 bgcolor="white"| Others
|-
|align="left"|Enniskillen
|bgcolor="#008800"|28.5
|bgcolor="#008800"|2
|20.5
|1
|18.2
|2
|28.2
|2
|4.6
|0
|7
|-
|align="left"|Erne East
|bgcolor="#008800"|52.5
|bgcolor="#008800"|3
|19.8
|1
|13.2
|1
|14.5
|1
|0.0
|0
|6
|-
|align="left"|Erne North
|18.5
|1
|bgcolor="40BFF5"|33.4
|bgcolor="40BFF5"|2
|20.1
|1
|27.9
|1
|0.0
|0
|5
|-
|align="left"|Erne West
|bgcolor="#008800"|46.3
|bgcolor="#008800"|3
|16.7
|1
|21.6
|1
|12.6
|0
|2.8
|0
|5
|- class="unsortable" class="sortbottom" style="background:#C9C9C9"
|align="left"| Total
|37.4
|9
|22.0
|5
|18.0
|5
|20.6
|4
|2.0
|0
|23
|-
|}

District results

Enniskillen

2001: 2 x Sinn Féin, 2 x UUP, 1 x SDLP, 1 x DUP, 1 x Independent
2005: 2 x Sinn Féin, 2 x DUP, 2 x SDLP, 1 x UUP
2001-2005 Change: DUP and SDLP gain from UUP and Independent

Erne East

2001: 3 x Sinn Féin, 2 x UUP, 1 x SDLP
2005: 3 x Sinn Féin, 1 x UUP, 1 x DUP, 1 x SDLP
2001-2005 Change: DUP gain from UUP

Erne North

2001: 2 x UUP, 1 x DUP, 1 x Sinn Féin, 1 x SDLP
2005: 2 x UUP, 1 x DUP, 1 x Sinn Féin, 1 x SDLP
2001-2005 Change: No change

Erne West

2001: 3 x Sinn Féin, 1 x UUP, 1 x SDLP
2005: 3 x Sinn Féin, 1 x UUP, 1 x SDLP
2001-2005 Change: No change

References

2005 Northern Ireland local elections
21st century in County Fermanagh
Fermanagh District Council elections